Resurrection ( or ) is a 1923 German silent drama film directed by Frederic Zelnik and starring Lya Mara, Rudolf Forster and Lydia Potechina. It premiered at the Marmorhaus in Berlin.

Cast
 Lya Mara
 Rudolf Forster
 Lydia Potechina
 Paul Graetz
 Olga Engl
 Leonhard Haskel
 Ilka Grüning
 Karl Falkenberg
 Maria Forescu
 Lili Alexandra
 Josef Commer
 Rudolf Klein-Rhoden
 Albert Patry
 Maria Peterson
 Lydia Tridenskaja

References

Bibliography
 Bock, Hans-Michael & Bergfelder, Tim. The Concise CineGraph. Encyclopedia of German Cinema. Berghahn Books, 2009.

External links

1923 films
Films of the Weimar Republic
German silent feature films
Films directed by Frederic Zelnik
German black-and-white films
Films based on Resurrection
Films set in Russia
1920s German films